Laccopetalum is a monotypic genus of flowering plants in the family Ranunculaceae. The genus contains only one species, Laccopetalum giganteum, which is endemic to Peru.

References 

Ranunculaceae genera
Flora of Peru
Monotypic Ranunculales genera
Ranunculaceae